Journey to Yourland ( or ) is a 2022 co-production animated film directed by Slovak director Peter Budinský.

Plot 
Young Riki moves with his mother to a new place. He meets dangerous crows and a shiny rock with mysterious power. Riki is transported to Yourland where he meets a girl named Emma, an ape named Tidling and the mighty Kovoman.

References

External links
 
 Journey to Yourland at ČSFD.cz 

2022 films
Slovak animated films
Slovak fantasy films
Czech adventure films
Czech animated films
Czech fantasy films
Belgian adventure films
Belgian animated films
Belgian fantasy films
2022 animated films
Czech animated adventure films
Czech animated fantasy films